The 2011 Major League Baseball All-Star Game was the 82nd in-season exhibition game between the All-Stars of the National League (NL) and the American League (AL); the leagues composing Major League Baseball. The event was held on Tuesday, July 12, 2011 at Chase Field in Phoenix, Arizona, home of the National League Arizona Diamondbacks. The game ended in a 5–1 win for the National League, their second straight All-Star victory. It was the first MLB All-Star Game to be held in Arizona and the first in a National League Park to have a designated hitter.

With a combination of injuries and rule enforcements, a record 84 players were named to the All-Star rosters.  This broke the record of 82 players that were on rosters for the 2010 game.

Background
As with each All-Star Game since 1970, the nine starting position players  of each league were elected by fan balloting. The remaining players were selected by a players' vote, each league's team manager, and a second fan balloting to add one more player to each roster. In all, 32 players were selected to each league's team, not including players who decline to play due to injuries or personal reasons.

Diamondbacks manager Bob Melvin confirmed on April 10, 2009, that Arizona would host the 2011 All-Star Game and it was officially announced by Commissioner Bud Selig the next day. Phoenix had never hosted the All-Star Game before; the last first-time host city was Denver, Colorado in 1998. The game was the ninth straight All-Star Game to decide home-field advantage in the World Series. Prior All-Star games had only used the designated hitter (DH) rule when in American League parks. However, the 2011 game was the first to feature a DH in a NL park following a rules change in 2010. The NL came into the game having won the previous year's match, their first victory since 1996.

Immigration controversy
Some, such as New York Congressman José Serrano and sportswriter Mike Lupica, had suggested that Major League Baseball Commissioner Bud Selig should move the game because of the controversial SB1070 anti-illegal immigration bill passed by the Arizona legislature and signed into law by Governor Jan Brewer. Others considered asking club owners, sponsors and even players to boycott the All-Star Game if the law was implemented and the game remained in Phoenix.  However, Selig announced  on May 13, 2010, that the game would remain at Chase Field in Phoenix as planned.

Fan balloting

Starters
Balloting for the 2011 All-Star Game starters began online April 26 and continued through June 30. Fan voting also took place in each MLB stadium, beginning May 10 (at the latest) and ending on June 24. The top vote-getters at each position and the top three among outfielders, were named the starters for their respective leagues. The results were announced on July 3. A record 32.5 million votes were cast, beating out the previous record from 2009 by roughly 9 million. José Bautista was the leading vote-getter with 7,454,753 votes, easily breaking the previous single-player vote record of 6,069,688 held by Ken Griffey Jr. Three other American League players also topped Griffey's record. Ryan Braun was the National League's leading vote getter, receiving a NL record 5,928,004 votes.

Final roster spot
After the rosters were revealed, a second ballot of five players per league was created for the All-Star Final Vote to determine the 34th and final player of each roster, with online balloting conducted from Sunday afternoon, July 3, through Thursday afternoon, July 7.  The winners of the final vote were Paul Konerko of the Chicago White Sox (AL) and Shane Victorino of the Philadelphia Phillies. Victorino became the first ever two-time Final Vote winner, having also won in 2009.

Rosters
Players in italics have since been inducted into the National Baseball Hall of Fame.

American League

National League

Game summary

Starters

Box Score

UMPIRES: Home Plate – Dale Scott; First Base – Jerry Layne; Second Base – Hunter Wendelstedt; Third Base – Dan Iassogna; Left Field – Ed Hickox; Right Field – Chris Guccione 
Weather: Indoors 
Time of Game: 2:50 Attendance: 47,994

The American League struck first on Adrián González's two-out home run in the fourth off of Cliff Lee, who allowed two singles. Tyler Clippard in relief allowed a single to Adrian Beltre, but José Bautista was tagged out at home to end the inning. In the bottom half, after two leadoff singles, Prince Fielder's three-run home run off of C. J. Wilson put the National League up 3–1. Next inning, Rickie Weeks reached first on a fielder's choice, stole second and scored on Andre Ethier's single off of Jordan Walden. The National League added another run in the seventh when Hunter Pence hit a leadoff single, moved to third on Brandon League's passed ball and scored on Pablo Sandoval's ground-rule double and went on to win the game 5–1.

All-Star Game notes

Prince Fielder's three-run home run in the bottom of the fourth inning was the first home run ever hit by a Milwaukee Brewers player in the All-Star Game.
Adrián González's home run off of Cliff Lee and Fielder's home run off of C. J. Wilson makes it the first time in All-Star Game history where there were two lefty-versus-lefty home runs.
Brian Wilson became the second pitcher since 1969 (when saves became an official stat) to earn a save in the All-Star Game after recording a save in the clinching game of the previous World Series.  Dennis Eckersley accomplished this feat by finishing the World Series in 1989 and then in the 1990 All-Star Game at Wrigley Field.
Tyler Clippard became the first pitcher in Major League history to earn a win in an All-Star Game or a postseason game by facing only one batter and allowing a hit. Adrián Beltré singled to left off Clippard, but Hunter Pence threw José Bautista out at home plate to end the top of the fourth inning. The NL took the lead for good in the bottom half of the frame, making Clippard the pitcher of record.
This was also the second-straight All-Star Game where the winning pitcher was a member of the Washington Nationals.  Matt Capps was the winner in 2010.
Eight different American League pitchers struck out at least one batter, a record for an All-Star Game that did not go extra innings.
 Relief pitcher Heath Bell had players and fans laughing as he entered the game in the eight inning. Bell sprinted from the bullpen and did a slide in front of the pitcher's mound, taking out a chunk of the infield grass and leaving grass stains on his pants. "I wanted the fans to have fun with this", said Bell.
 For the first time in his career, Ichiro Suzuki was not named to the All-Star team.
 This marked the first time in which the All-Star Game was entirely played indoors since 1986, when it was played at the Astrodome in Houston.

See also

All-Star Futures Game
Home Run Derby

References

External links

Official website of the All-Star Game
2011 Major League Baseball All-Star Game at Baseball-Reference

Major League Baseball All-Star Game
Baseball competitions in Phoenix, Arizona
Major League Baseball All-star Game, 2011
Major League Baseball All Star Game
2010s in Phoenix, Arizona
Major League Baseball All Star Game